Brooktree was an American company founded in 1983 by Henry Katzenstein to commercialize a faster hardware architecture for digital to analog converters, three to eight times faster than the converters then on the market.

The company was bought out by Rockwell Semiconductor in 1996, which became Conexant in 1998.

Brooktree's best-known products included IC chipsets such as the Bt8x8 family. These were frequently used in TV tuner cards.

See also 
 Video capture card
 Hauppauge Computer Works

References 

Electronics companies of the United States
Companies established in 1983
Companies formerly listed on the Nasdaq
1983 establishments in the United States